Antonello Cuccureddu (4 October 1949) is an Italian association football coach and former player who played as a defender. He last managed Lega Pro Prima Divisione club Grosseto in 2014.

Club career

A central defender, Cuccureddu spent his club playing career with Brescia (1968–69), Juventus (1969–81, winning six Serie A titles), and Fiorentina (1981–83).

Rather prolific for being a defender (he had a very strong long distance shot), in one league season he managed to score 12 goals (during the 1973–74 Italian Serie A season), although in that season he played as a midfielder. His most famous goal in the league was scored at the Stadio Olimpico in Rome, facing A.S. Roma in the last match of the 1972–73 Serie A season: with that goal Juventus beat Roma 2–1 and won their 15th domestic title by 1 point over A.C. Milan, who were leading the league until the final match of the season, and finished 2 points over S.S. Lazio.

International career

At international level, Cuccureddu earned 13 caps for the Italy national football team, and played in the 1978 FIFA World Cup (where he featured in 5 fixtures, including the match against Argentina, which Italy won 1–0, and the 3rd place final against Brazil, which Italy lost 1–2).

Style of play
Cuccureddu was a hard-working and tactically versatile footballer, who was capable of aiding his team both offensively and defensively, and of playing anywhere in defence or midfield. Throughout his career, he was primarily deployed as a defender, and was capable of playing as an offensive wing-back, as a full-back, or as a centre-back, which was his usual position. He also played in midfield on occasion, which was his initial position at the beginning of his career, and was deployed as a mezzala, as a central, box-to-box, defensive midfielder, or attacking midfielder on occasion.

As a footballer, he was known in particular for his dynamism, stamina, his ability to read the game, vision, and tactical intelligence. Although he was primarily a defensive-minded player, he was quite prolific in front of goal throughout his career, as he possessed an accurate and powerful shot with his right foot from outside the area, which also made him a dangerous goal threat; due to his striking ability, he was an accurate set-piece and penalty kick taker.

Managerial career
As a coach, he won both the Torneo di Viareggio and the Campionato Nazionale Primavera in 1994 with the Juventus Primavera side. During the 1999–2000 Serie C1 season, he led Crotone to the Girone B title, helping the club to Serie B promotion.

In the 2006–07 season he led Grosseto to become Serie C1/A winners and gain a historical first-ever promotion to Serie B. Cuccureddu left Grosseto soon after the end of the season to join Serie C1 club Perugia, where he did not manage to repeat his successes at Grosseto. From March 2009 he was the new head coach of Lega Pro Prima Divisione side Pescara; this adventure ended in January 2010, when he was replaced by Eusebio Di Francesco, former coach of Lanciano. In 2013, he returned to Grosseto in Lega Pro Prima Divisione, where he remained until January 2014, after being sacked, due to the club's negative results.

Coaching tactics
As a coach, Cuccureddu built his teams on tactically traditional formations, based on defensive stability, favouring a four-man defensive line in either a 4–4–2, or a 4–3–1–2 formation.

Honours

Player
Juventus
 6 Serie A: 1971–72, 1972–73, 1974–75, 1976–77, 1977–78, 1980–81
 1 Coppa Italia: 1978–79
 1 UEFA Cup: 1976–77

Manager
Juventus Primavera
Torneo di Viareggio: 1994
Campionato Nazionale Primavera: 1993–94

Crotone
Serie C1 (Girone B): 1999–2000

Grosseto
Serie C1 (Girone A): 2006–07

References

1949 births
Living people
Footballers from Sardinia
Association football defenders
Association football midfielders
Italian footballers
Italian football managers
Italy international footballers
Italy under-21 international footballers
1978 FIFA World Cup players
Serie A players
Serie B players
Serie C players
Brescia Calcio players
Juventus F.C. players
ACF Fiorentina players
Novara F.C. players
People from Alghero
U.S. Avellino 1912 managers
F.C. Crotone managers
F.C. Grosseto S.S.D. managers
Ternana Calcio managers
A.C. Perugia Calcio managers
Delfino Pescara 1936 managers
UEFA Cup winning players
S.E.F. Torres 1903 players
Pol. Alghero players